Statistics of American Soccer League in the 1932 season.

Overview
The history of the American Soccer League begins to become difficult to determine at this point.  It appears the league began a 1932 season in the spring of 1932.  Whether this season as completed or abandoned during the season is unclear from the records.  In October 1932, the league resumed play with a vastly different line-up of teams from its spring season.

League standings

External links
The Year in American Soccer - 1932
The Year in American Soccer - 1933

1932
American